Pilar Javaloyas is a Spanish paralympic athlete who competed in Para swimming. She won eleven medals at the 1980, 1984, and 1988 Summer Paralympics.

Career 
At the 1980 Summer Paralympics, she won silver medals in 100 meters breaststroke 6, 100 meters backstroke 6, 100 meters freestyle 6, 100 meters butterfly 6, and 200 individual medley 6.

At the 1984 Summer Paralympics, she won a silver medal 100 meters backstroke L5, and bronze medals in 100 meters butterfly L5, and 200 meters individual medley L5.

At the 1988 Summer Paralympics, in Seoul, she won gold medals, in 100 meters backstroke 6, 100 meters butterfly 6, and a bronze medal 400 meters freestyle 6.

References 

Year of birth missing (living people)
Living people
Sportspeople from Valencia
Paralympic swimmers of Spain
Spanish female freestyle swimmers
Spanish female backstroke swimmers
Spanish female breaststroke swimmers
Spanish female butterfly swimmers
Spanish female medley swimmers
Swimmers at the 1980 Summer Paralympics
Swimmers at the 1984 Summer Paralympics
Swimmers at the 1988 Summer Paralympics
Medalists at the 1980 Summer Paralympics
Medalists at the 1984 Summer Paralympics
Medalists at the 1988 Summer Paralympics
Paralympic gold medalists for Spain
Paralympic silver medalists for Spain
Paralympic bronze medalists for Spain